Macroeconomic Dynamics is a peer-reviewed academic journal covering macroeconomics. The editor-in-chief is William A. Barnett (University of Kansas) and it is published by Cambridge University Press. It was established in 1997 with a frequency of 4 issues per year, but it later moved to a frequency of 8 issues per year. In addition to regular scientific articles, the journal occasionally publishes interviews with leading scholars in economics.

External links 
 

Economics journals
Cambridge University Press academic journals
Publications established in 1997
English-language journals
8 times per year journals